Psychrobacter cryohalolentis is a Gram-negative, nonmotile species of bacteria. It was first isolated from Siberian permafrost. Its type strain is K5T (=DSM 17306T =VKM B-2378T).

Hypoacylated lipopolysaccharide (LPS) from P. cryohalolentis induces moderate TLR4-mediated inflammatory response in macrophages and such LPS bioactivity may potentially result in the failure of local and systemic bacterial clearance in patients.

References

Further reading
Whitman, William B., et al., eds. Bergey's manual® of systematic bacteriology. Vol. 5. Springer, 2012.
Dworkin, Martin, and Stanley Falkow, eds. The Prokaryotes: Vol. 6: Proteobacteria: Gamma Subclass. Vol. 6. Springer, 2006.

External links
LPSN

Type strain of Psychrobacter cryohalolentis at BacDive -  the Bacterial Diversity Metadatabase

Moraxellaceae
Bacteria described in 2007